Boris Kuschnir (born 1948) is a Ukrainian-born Austrian violinist and academic.

Background and early life

Career
In 1982 he became an Austrian citizen. He is a professor at the Konservatorium Wien University since 1984 and also a distinguished Professor at the University of Music in Graz since 1999.

Playing in various chamber music ensembles, he co-founded the Wiener Schubert Trio in 1984, the Vienna Brahms Trio in 1993 and the Kopelman Quartet in 2002.

Students
Several of Kuschnir's students were successful at international violin competitions: 
Julian Rachlin (1st Prize Eurovision Grand Prix for Young Musicians, Amsterdam 1988)
Nikolaj Znaider (1st Prize of the Queen Elisabeth Competition, Brussels 1997)
Sergey Dogadin (1st Prize of the Joseph Joachim International Violin Competition, Hannover 2015, 1st Prize of the XVI International Tchaikovsky Competition, Moscow 2019)
Pavel Milyukov (3rd Prize International Tchaikovsky Competition, Moscow 2015, 1st Prize Aram Khachaturian International Competition, 2012, 2nd Prize Seoul International Music Competition, 2012) 
Lidia Baich (1st Prize Eurovision Grand Prix for Young Musicians, Vienna 1998)
Dalibor Karvay (1st Prize Eurovision Grand Prix for Young Musicians, Berlin 2002; 1st Prize International Tibor Varga Competition, Switzerland 2003; 1st Prize David Oistrakh Competition, Moscow 2008)
Alexandra Soumm (1st Prize Eurovision Grand Prix for Young Musicians, Lucerne 2004)
Lorenzo Gatto (2nd Prize Queen Elizabeth Competition, Brussels 2009)
Yevgeny Chepovetsky (2nd Prize David Oistrakh International Competition, Moscow 2008 and 3rd Prize Luois Spohr Competition, 2013) 
Yuuki Wong (2nd Prize Michael Hill Competition, New Zealand 2007)
Julia Turnovsky (3rd Prize David Oistrakh International Competition, Moscow 2008) 
Aleksey Igudesman (Igudesman & Joo)
 María Dueñas (1st Prize Yehudi Menuhin Competition, Richmond, Virginia 2021)

In addition to this he educated more than 40 laureates of national and international competitions. His pupils have been appointed Professors at Universities, playing in various chamber music ensembles and orchestras of the world – 6 of his students play at the Vienna Philharmonics.

Violin Competitions
Kuschnir gives masterclasses at renowned classical music events like the Verbier Festival Academy and Kronberg Academy. He appears as a jury member of various international music competitions such as the Queen Elizabeth Music Competition in Brussels, Tchaikovsky Competition in Moscow, the International Violin Competition of Indianapolis, Niccolò Paganini Competition in Genua, the Jacques Thibaud Competition in Paris, Joseph Joachim Competition in Hannover, Tibor Varga Competition in Switzerland, Michael Hill Competition in New Zealand, Eurovision Competition, David Oistrakh Competition in Moscow, Pablo de Sarasate Competition in Pamplona, George Enescu Competition in Bucharest, Seoul International Music Competition, Violin Masters in Monte Carlo, ARD International Music Competition in Munich, Louis Spohr Competition in Weimar, Andrea Postacchini International Violin Competition in Fermo, Aram Khachaturian International Competition in Jerewan, the Yankelevitch International Violin Competition in Omsk and the Melbourne International Chamber Music Competition.

Chamber music
In 1984 Boris Kuschnir founded the Wiener Schubert Trio which received many prestigious awards, among them the 1. Prize at the international Chamber Music Competition Sergio Lorenzi in Trieste, the Mozart Interpretationspreis 1988 in Vienna and the Prize of the Ernst von Siemens Foundation 1990.

Kuschnir founded the Vienna Brahms Trio in 1993. In 1996, the trio won first prize at the 9th International Chamber Music Competition in Illzach, France. Their recording of Schumann's complete works for piano trio was released on the Naxos label in 1999.

He was co-founder of the Kopelman Quartet in 2002, with which he is giving concerts all over the world since and has released CDs at Nimbus Records and Wigmore Hall Live.

References 

Ukrainian violinists
Male violinists
Ukrainian academics
Academic staff of the University of Music and Performing Arts Graz
Living people
1948 births
21st-century violinists
21st-century male musicians
Academic staff of the Music and Arts University of the City of Vienna